"Feeling This" is a song by American rock band Blink-182 for their untitled fifth studio album (2003). The song is the opening track on the album and was released as its lead single on October 6, 2003, through Geffen Records. It was written by guitarist Tom DeLonge, bassist Mark Hoppus, and drummer Travis Barker, and was produced and mixed by Jerry Finn. The song originated on the first day of producing the album. Its lyrics are purely sexual in nature; the band juxtaposes lust and passion between verses and choruses, thematically connected with a wistful, regretful tone.

The song features a Latin-inspired backbeat in the chorus, and the song ends in a melodic, harmonized duet split between DeLonge and Hoppus. Elements of the song were inspired by rock groups Led Zeppelin and the Beach Boys. The song's music video, photographed by David LaChapelle, depicts a dystopian correctional facility that is overtaken by its inmates. An early version of the song, erroneously titled "Action", was released on the soundtrack for the video game Madden NFL 2004.

"Feeling This" received critical acclaim and the song peaked to number two on Billboard Modern Rock Tracks chart in late 2003. It was also a top-20 hit in the United Kingdom and Australia. The digital single was certified gold by the Recording Industry Association of America in 2005. Blink-182 has performed "Feeling This" in a number of live appearances, including on Jimmy Kimmel Live!.

Background

"Feeling This" was the first track that was recorded for Blink-182 in early 2003. On the first day of pre-production on the album, bassist Mark Hoppus asked an engineer to explain Pro Tools to him, as it was the first time the band would record their music digitally. He began recording guitar and bass parts and experimenting with the software. When guitarist Tom DeLonge and drummer Travis Barker arrived, they too began adding new tracks to the project. The song was written in one day. "I think if I sit there and try to analyze everything, what would be cool here or there, I just feel like I get so far away from what I would do, and I think your gut instinct is usually the best thing," said Barker at the time.

The lyrics were written with Hoppus and DeLonge going into separate rooms—Hoppus writing the choruses and DeLonge writing the verses. The two had not spoken to each other about the lyrics ahead of time, and it turned out that the two had both written about sex. When put together, the song represents the lustful side of sex during the verses, the passionate side in the bridge and the romantic side in the chorus, creating a juxtaposition between both voices. It has been interpreted as a description for failed romance, one that "illustrates a scenario of lust, ambivalence and regret." For Barker, the song's drum track was "super in respect to John Bonham. [...] We were kind of messing around with the verse. It’s like, 'Well, I want to do a four-bar drum intro and just see how it works for the song.' And we never second-guessed it. We were like, 'That sounds rad.'"

According to engineer Ryan Hewitt, the track contains "four distinct drum sounds created by old school tape editing." The song was recorded "part-by-part, committing to different sounds by changing relative levels, EQ, and compression throughout," and the engineers would slightly move microphones used to record Barker's drum kit to tailor the natural ambience of the home it was recorded in. Upon playback of a rough mix of the song, the engineer automated the music to fade at the song's conclusion, but mistakenly forgot to do the same for the vocal tracks. Hoppus, who had been listening to the Beach Boys at the time, liked the a cappella interplay of their voices. All agreed to keep it in the final version of the song.

Composition

The song is composed in the key of E major and is set in time signature of common time with a tempo of 173 beats per minute. The vocal range spans from E3 to B4.

"Feeling This" opens with flanged drums. Although computer technology offered it during the album’s production, according to Hoppus, the band opted to produce the effect "the old school way", opting for two tape machines. Originally taking root as a faster-paced drum 'n' bass-inspired track, Barker imitated that genre's groove on open hi-hats. The influence of John Bonham is most explicit in the song's first few seconds, in which Barker performs eighth-note triplets on his bass drum, much like the Led Zeppelin song "Good Times Bad Times" (1969). Following a sample from Captain America (1990)—"Get ready for action!—the song moves into a "stabbing guitar rhythm" over the verses, which are "half-barked" and contain delivery reminiscent of hip-hop. The "harmony-rich" chorus of the song, which contains the refrain "Fate fell short this time, smile fades in the summer / Place your hand in mine, I'll leave when I wanna", is replete with a "syncopated Latin-flavored backbeat." In the chorus, Barker plays a cowbell, which he initially included as a joke, believing Hoppus and DeLonge would "hate it."

The song is particularly memorable for a section of the chorus of the song (right before the bridge begins), in which guitarist Tom DeLonge sings the vocals loudly and off-key. The end of the song is a melodic duet between the band's two vocalists, both singing conflicting but harmonizing parts.

Release
Blink-182 first performed "Feeling This" alongside other new songs from Blink-182 during their performances at the 2003 Reading and Leeds festivals. The band picked "Feeling This" as the first single because they felt it representative of the transition they had undergone since their fourth studio album, Take Off Your Pants and Jacket (2001). A slightly different version of the song had been released previously as part of the soundtrack for the video game Madden NFL 2004 under the erroneous title "Action". Barker explained in an interview that "'Action' just sounded kind of dorky to us. Like we would always call it 'Feeling This' and then someone at our label, I think, like wrote it as 'Action' one time and sent out singles to people. And it was always supposed to be 'Feeling This'."

To promote Blink-182, the group performed "Feeling This", as well as their past hit "Dammit" on Total Request Live on November 11, 2003, and on the late-night talk show Jimmy Kimmel Live! in November 26, 2003. Richard Cheese covered the song on their 2004 album I'd Like a Virgin.

Commercial performance
"Feeling This" debuted at number 40 on Billboard Modern Rock Tracks chart on October 18, 2003, jumping to number 13 in its second week, which was at that time the fourth-biggest move in the history of that chart. The song moved upwards on the chart over the following weeks, eventually achieving a peak of number two (behind Linkin Park's hit "Numb") on November 29, 2003. It remained at number two for two more weeks before dropping to number three, after which it continued dropping before exiting the top 20 on February 21, 2004. In total, it spent twenty-six weeks on the chart. It spent eight weeks on the Bubbling Under Hot 100 Singles, which acts as an extension to the Billboard Hot 100 chart; it peaked at number two on December 20, 2003.

In the United Kingdom, "Feeling This" debuted at number 15 on the UK Singles Chart for the week ending date November 30, 2003. It dropped to number 35 the following week before exiting the chart on December 28; in all, it spent ten weeks on the chart.

Critical reception
"Feeling This" received favorable reviews from music critics. Kelefa Sanneh, writing for The New York Times felt the song was an "appealing hybrid," while noting the growing popularity of emo could have influenced the "more anguished" tone. Greg Kot of Entertainment Weekly praised the vocal harmonies, calling them reminiscent of Queen. Joshua Klein of The Washington Post similarly complimented the interplay between DeLonge and Hoppus and its "multiple-perspective portrait of first love." Andy Doerschuk of Drum! praised Barker's "fat, syncopated beat" and noted elements of Bonham as well as James Brown's drummers. Rolling Stone Jenny Eliscu made note of its "catchy hooks", while Stephen Thompson, writing for The A.V. Club, considered it among many songs on the album that were "straightforwardly conventional."

Music video

The video follows students at a dystopian-based correctional facility who rebel and take over the establishment, intertwined with shots of the band performing outside the prison in a cage, providing a "soundtrack to the chaos." Hoppus described their idea for the facility: "It's kind of a combination of prep school and reform school, and it's very repressed and kids are being held down. There is a lot of authority and a lot of strict regimen, and the kids lash out and take over the school and destroy the place with Prison riot." The band's main goal for the video was for it to resemble an art piece, much in the same way they viewed the production of the album, to keep in line with tone. To this end, they enlisted director David LaChapelle. LaChapelle's input—which "ranges from an evil prison warden cracking a whip at marching school kids to escapees ripping their uniforms and doing acrobatic moves down the hallways"—was regarded by the band as "completely wacked out and twisted, which is exactly what we love."

In the narrative, the boys and girls are separated at the school and sexually repressed, and release their energies when they meet between a glass window. The entire music video was shot on September 30, 2003, at the abandoned Lincoln Heights Jail north of downtown Los Angeles, only a few days ahead of its premiere.

Formats and track listings
All songs were written and composed by Tom DeLonge, Mark Hoppus and Travis Barker, except where noted.

US CD (2003) (981432-0)
 "Feeling This" – 2:56
 "Violence" – 3:48
 "The Rock Show" (Live in Chicago) – 3:08
 "Carousel" (Live in Chicago) – 2:55 (DeLonge/Hoppus)

US 7-inch single (2003) (B0001518-21)
 "Feeling This" – 2:56
 "Violence" – 3:48
UK CD (2003) (981432-0)
 "Feeling This" – 2:56
 "The Rock Show" (Live in Chicago) – 3:08

Credits and personnel
Credits are adapted from the liner notes of Blink-182, Geffen Records.

Blink-182
 Mark Hoppus – vocals, bass guitar
 Tom DeLonge – vocals, guitar
 Travis Barker – drums, percussion

Production
 Jerry Finn – producer, mix engineer
 Ryan Hewitt – engineer
 Brian Gardner – mastering engineer
 Max Gramajo – cover illustration
 Rick DeVoe – management

Charts

Certifications

Release history

References

 

2003 singles
2003 songs
Blink-182 songs
Geffen Records singles
Music videos directed by David LaChapelle
Songs written by Mark Hoppus
Songs written by Tom DeLonge
Songs written by Travis Barker
Songs containing the I–V-vi-IV progression